Correll Nunatak is a nunatak lying within the western part of Mertz Glacier, about  south of Aurora Peak. It was discovered by the Australasian Antarctic Expedition (1911–14) under Douglas Mawson, who named it for Percy E. Correll, a mechanic with the expedition.

References 

Nunataks of George V Land